Elizabeth Dowdall ( Southwell);  – after 1642) was a member of the Irish gentry, famed for having defended Kilfinny Castle, County Limerick, against the insurgents during the Irish Rebellion of 1641.

Birth and background 
Elizabeth was born about 1600 in England, probably in Cornworthy, Devon, the only child of Sir Thomas Southwell and his wife, Anne Harris. Her father's family was from Spixworth in Norfolk.

Elizabeth's mother was an English Calvinist poet. Her father was Thomas Harris (Serjeant-at-Law). Her father's family was from Cornworthy, Devon. Elizabeth's parents had married at St Clement Danes in London on 24 June 1594.

Early life 
It is quite well accepted that Elizabeth's father was knighted. However, the person knighted in July 1603 as part of the coronation honours of James I seems to have been her maternal grandfather, Thomas Harris (Serjeant-at-Law), not her father as has been said.

Elizabeth's maternal uncle Edward Harris (Irish judge) was sent to Ireland in 1608 and made chief justice of Munster. He helped his brother-in-law to obtain land at Poulnelong, County Cork, Ireland as part of the Plantation of Munster, which had started in 1583 after the Desmond Rebellions ended with the death of Gerald FitzGerald, 14th Earl of Desmond. Elizabeth's uncle Sir Edward Harris played a leading part in this plantation.

First marriage 
Elizabeth married Sir John Dowdall, a wealthy settler in County Limerick, Ireland (alive in 1623).

John and Elizabeth had five daughters:
 Anne, married John Southwell of Rathkeale, brother of Sir Thomas Southwell, 1st Baronet, and Anne's fifth cousin three times removed. John was killed by the rebels in 1642 and died childless. She later married George Piggott, of Kilfinny.
 Elizabeth (died 1658), married Sir Hardress Waller in 1629
 Jane (died before 1638), married Redmond Roche as his first wife
 Bridget, married Thomas Casey of Rathcannon, County Limerick
 Honora (died 1638), married Lawrence Dowdall of Mountown, County Meath

Father's death and mother's remarriage 
Her father died on 12 June 1626 in Ireland. Her mother remarried Captain Henry Sibthorpe and after two years the new couple moved back to England. Her mother died on 2 October 1636 in Acton, London, England.

Second marriage 
Elizabeth married secondly Donough, eldest son of Daniel O'Brien, brother of Donogh O'Brien, 4th Earl of Thomond and future (1662) 1st Viscount Clare. Elizabeth appears to have been married to him by 1626. Donough died on 6 August 1638 in Limerick predeceasing his father.

Defence of Kilfinny Castle 
Phelim O'Neill launched the Irish Rebellion of 1641 from the northern province of Ulster in October 1641. The rebellion reached Munster in spring 1642. The rebels attacked the castles of the English settlers. Dowdall defended Kilfinny Castle against the rebels, and is reputed to have hung several of them during the fighting.

It is not known what happened to Dowdall after 1642.

See also 
 Lettice Digby, 1st Baroness Offaly, who also coordinated the defence of a castle during the rebellion.

Notes and references

Notes

References

Sources 

 – D to M (for Ship-pool in Leighmoney parish)
  – 1221 to 1690
 – Irish Women’s Writing and Traditions (for Lady Dowdall's narration)

 – 1665 to 1707
 

 – Letters, acts, and Lady Dowdall’s narration

 – G to Z (for Ship-pool)
 – Earls 228
 – Viscounts, barons (under Southwell)
 – Parliaments & Biographies (PDF downloadable from given URL)
 – Normans, English, Huguenots etc.
 – Preview
 

1658 deaths
17th-century Irish people
17th-century Irish women
History of County Limerick
Irish nobility
Nobility from County Limerick
People of the Irish Confederate Wars
Wives of knights
Women in 17th-century warfare
Women in European warfare
Year of birth uncertain